Noothi lo kappalu (English: Frogs in a Well) is a 2015 low-budget Telugu Film written and directed by Chanti Gnamamani. The film stars Rajendra Prasad and Pari Singh.

Plot
Rajendra Prasad is acting in a pivotal role. Jaya Prakash is a police officer. The term "frogs" is used to as a metaphor to refer to lazy youth who do not dare to come out of darkness; the "frogs" inside a well do not come out, nor do they let others get out.

Cast
 Rajendra Prasad
 Pari Singh
 Diksha Panth
 Bharat Bhushan
 RamTej
 Jaya Prakash Reddy
 Vijay Sai
 Manoj Nandam
 Thagubothu Ramesh
 Allari Subhashini
 Sanjay Reddy as Nandu's father

Soundtrack
The music album for the movie was released in audio function anchored by Sattanna, in mid 2013. The music directors Subhash Anand, Sai Karthik, Sathya Kasyap, Ravi Shankar, Ghantasala Viswanath were involved in composing various songs.

References

External links
Movie progress report
review

Indian comedy films
2010s Telugu-language films
2015 films
2015 comedy films